Ramazan is a village in the Absheron Rayon of Azerbaijan.

It is suspected that this village has undergone a name change or no longer exists, as no Azerbaijani website mentions it under this name.

References
 

Populated places in Absheron District